Cessnock Castle is a 15th-century keep greatly enlarged into a baronial mansion, about  south east of Galston, East Ayrshire, Scotland, and  south of the River Irvine.

History
The earliest record of this property shows that a building existed in 1296. The Campbells first owned the property, and it was owned thereafter by the families of Dick, Wallace, and Scott, before being acquired by the De Fresnes in 1946.

Mary, Queen of Scots resorted here after the defeat of Langside.  It was also visited by George Wishart, John Knox and Robert Burns.

Structure
The massive keep, which stands in a ravine of the Burnanne has three storeys, and an attic, to which a large mansion has been added, making the building U-plan.  The tower has a gabled roof, which is corbie-stepped.  The parapets have been demolished, although bartizans remain.  
There is a vaulted basement.  The first floor would have housed the hall, while private chambers were in the floors above.  A painted ceiling dating from the late 16th century remains in the great hall in the newer part.  
A modern wall forms the four side of a rectangle.

There was a bell tower on the north west gable end of the tower but this has been demolished. The New South Wales Hunter Valley town of Cessnock was named after the castle when it was settled in the 1820s.

Traditions
While Mary, Queen of Scots, was at Cessnock one of her ladies died, and she is said to haunt the castle.  It is also said to be haunted by John Knox.

See also
Castles in Great Britain and Ireland
List of castles in Scotland

References

Castles in East Ayrshire